District of Arizona was a subordinate district of the Department of New Mexico territory created on August 30, 1862 and transferred to the Department of the Pacific in March 1865.

District of Arizona (Dept. of New Mexico) commanders
Headquarters at Franklin, Texas, then Mesilla Post until 1864.
 James H. Carleton – August 30, 1862 – September 5, 1862
 Joseph R. West – September 5, 1862 – January 29, 1864
 George W. Bowie – January 29, 1864 – November 1864
 Joseph R. Smith – November 1864 – December 8, 1864

District of Arizona (Dept. of the Pacific) commanders
Headquarters Prescott, Arizona
 John S. Mason – March 7, 1865 – July 27, 1865

On July 27, 1865 the Military Division of the Pacific was created under Major General Henry W. Halleck, replacing the Department of the Pacific, consisting of the Department of the Columbia and the expanded Department of California, that absorbed the District of Southern California and that consisted of the States of California and Nevada and the District of New Mexico in the Territory of New Mexico and District of Arizona in the  Territory of Arizona.

Arizona remained a district until it became the Department of Arizona under the Military Division of the Pacific on April 15, 1870.  Colonel George Stoneman transitioned from district to department commander, serving until June 4, 1871.  The new department consisted of Arizona Territory and California south of a line from the northwest corner of Arizona to Point Conception so as to include most of Southern California.

District of Arizona (Military Division of the Pacific) commanders
 Major John S. Mason – March 7, 1865 – April 30, 1866
 Lt. Col. Henry D. Wallen – June 10 – August 11, 1866 
 Colonel Charles S. Lovell – August 11, 1866 – October 12, 1867
 Colonel Thomas L. Crittenden – October 12, 1867 – August 29, 1868
 Colonel Thomas C. Devin – August 29, 1868 – August 16, 1869
 Colonel George Stoneman – August 16, 1869 – May 3, 1870

Posts 
 Fort Buchanan – 1856–1861, 1862
 Fort Breckenridge – 1857–1861, Fort Stanford 1862, Camp Wright 1865, Camp Grant – 1865–1873
 Fort Mojave – 1858–1861, 1863–1890
 Fort Tucson – 1860–1862
 Tucson Armory – 1862–1864
 Fort Barrett – 1862
 Fort Bowie – 1862–1894
 Mission Camp, near Nogales – 1862
 Fort Tubac – 1862–1865, 1866–1868
 Camp La Paz – September 1863 – 1864, sub post of Fort Mohave between Olive City and La Paz, Arizona.
 Camp at Bear Spring – 1863–1864
 Fort Cerro – 1863 – ?
 Fort Canby – 1863–1864
 Camp Clark – 1863–1864
 Fort Whipple – 1864–1869
 Camp Pomeroy – 1863
 Camp on the Colorado River, Camp Colorado – 1864–1871, near Parker
 Fort Verde – 1864–1866
 Yuma Depot – 1864–1891
 Post at Calabasas 1865, Fort Mason – 1865–1866, Camp McKee 1866 in Rio Rico, Arizona
 Camp Cameron – 1866–1867, in Madera Canyon
 Camp Alexander – 1867, 12 miles up river from Fort Mohave at a crossing on the Colorado River.
 Camp Willow Grove – 1867–1869, south of Valentine
 Camp Devin, renamed Camp Toll Gate until 1870, Camp Hualpai – 1869–1873, near Paulden

See also
 California in the American Civil War
 New Mexico Territory in the American Civil War
 Arizona Territory in the American Civil War

References

Arizona
Arizona, District of
California in the American Civil War
Arizona in the American Civil War
Pacific Coast Theater of the American Civil War
1862 establishments in the United States